is an indies album by Jinn and its debut major album. It received its indie release on March 3, 2005, and later received its major album release on May 24, 2006.

Track listing

References

Jinn (band) albums
2006 albums